refers to the rite or ceremony by which a murti (vessel for the spirit of god) is consecrated in a Hindu temple, wherein hymns and mantra are recited to invite the deity to be resident guest, and the murti's eye is opened for the first time. Practiced in the temples of Hinduism and Jainism, the ritual is considered to infuse life into the Hindu temple, and bring to it the numinous presence of divinity and spirituality.

The ceremony, states Heather Elgood, marks the recognition of the image of god to represent "a particle of the divine whole, the divine perceived not in man's image as a separate entity but as a formless, indescribable omnipresent whole", with the divine presence a reminder of its transcendence and to be beheld in one's inner thoughts during darśana in the temple.

In Hinduism
The Sanskrit word , which in general usage means "resting" or "position", used in connection with a murti is translated by Apte as "the consecration of a vessel or dwelling".  The corresponding adjective  means "installed" or "consecrated". Prana means "life force, breath, spirit". The phrase Prana Pratishtha is a ritual that means, state Bhame and Krusche, "bringing life to the temple". It is also referred to as Murti Sthapana (image placement inside the temple), or the composite word Pranapratishtha. Traditionally, this was the step when the eye of the murti was sculpted open, inside the garbhagriha (Purusha space of the temple) of a Hindu temple.

The ritual typically involves a Puja, chanting of Sanskrit mantras as the deity is moved from outside into the center place, inviting the deity as resident guest of the temple, bathing and cleansing the deity whose feet may be washed just like a revered guest arriving after a long journey, dressing and seating in a place of comfort, placing the image's face towards east (marking sunrise), followed by Nyasa with hymns (act of touching different parts of the murti signifying the presence of various gods as sensory organs – Indra as hand, Brahma as heart, Surya as eyes, and so on), spraying of scented water and flowers, with the Chaksu͡unmilan (Sanskrit: "chakshu unmilan", opening of the divine eye) ceremony marking the high point of the ritual. The image is then considered as consecrated. In large and ceremonial public temples, the murti may be retired at sunset just like a guest retiring to bed, and then woken up at sunrise with pleasantries, washing, offering of fresh clothes, food and interaction with the devotees. Some temples may include elaborate procession, as community events such as traditional singing and dancing events to mark the celebration.

A special type of consecration is used for festival icons for the purpose of parading the deity for the community to receive the vision of the deity.

In Jainism

Digambara Jains consecrate the statue of a Jina by the ritual of Abhisheka, where the statue is awakened by pouring of auspicious liquids such as water, clarified butter, coconut milk, yellow sandalwood water, cow milk and other liquids successively. The temple is considered active only when the main Jina image has been consecrated. The ritual of consecrating an image to bring "life to temple" is attested in medieval Jain documents.

References

Cited sources

 (Fourth revised and enlarged edition).

Rituals in Hindu worship